Larry Pegram (born September 5, 1973 in Columbus, Ohio) is an American motorcycle racer.

Racing history

AMA Superbike
Pegram has been in the AMA Superbike scene for over a decade, first entering the championship in 1996.

In 2009 he had his best season finishing 4th overall with 3 wins and 5 podiums.

Superbike World Championship
Pegram made an appearance as a wildcard at Mazda Raceway Laguna Seca on July 13, 2014. After retiring in race one, he managed to score the 2 points in the second race, becoming the first rider in history to take an American machine into the points.

For 2015 Pegram was the manager and a team rider for Team Hero EBR alongside Niccolò Canepa.

America Flat Track

Pegram has been racing Flat Track since age 5. He has 3 Grand National Flat Track wins. 2 half-mile , and 1 mile victory. 

As an amateur he had over 33 national championship wins, an AMA record.

Pegram's wins in Superbike and Flat Track put him in a very small and elite group of riders.

Superbike Family Television Show 
Pegram and his Family were featured in a television show for three seasons called "Superbike Family" . The show centers around family life at the races.

Career statistics

AMA Pro American Superbike Championship

Superbike World Championship

Races by year
(key) (Races in bold indicate pole position, races in italics indicate fastest lap)

Supersport World Championship

Races by year

References

External links
PegramRacing.com – Official site
Larry Pegram profile at AMAProRacing.com
Larry Pegram profile at WorldSBK.com

1972 births
Living people
American motorcycle racers
Racing drivers from Columbus, Ohio
Racing drivers from Ohio
Superbike World Championship riders
Supersport World Championship riders
AMA Superbike Championship riders
AMA Grand National Championship riders
Indy Pro 2000 Championship drivers